Jorge Brian Panta Herreros (born 22 July 1995) is a Peruvian tennis player. 

Panta has a career high ATP singles ranking of 485 achieved on 13 January 2020. He also has a career high ATP doubles ranking of 402 achieved on 7 March 2020. Panta has won 5 ITF doubles titles. He also had reached a career high ranking of 9 on the juniors circuit, where he was a semifinalist at the 2012 US Open boys' doubles event.

Panta has represented Peru at the Davis Cup where he has a W/L record of 2–2.

ATP Challenger and ITF Futures finals

Singles: 11 (3–8)

Doubles: 37 (17–20)

External links
 
 
 

1995 births
Living people
Peruvian male tennis players
People from Piura
Sportspeople from Lima
South American Games silver medalists for Peru
South American Games medalists in tennis
Competitors at the 2018 South American Games
21st-century Peruvian people